Arizona is divided into 9 congressional districts, each represented by a member of the United States House of Representatives.

The districts are currently represented in the 118th United States Congress as legal entities. In 2018, Democrats became the majority in the state congressional delegation; however, the delegation has since reverted to a Republican majority as of 2023.

Current districts and representatives 
List of members of the United States House delegation from Arizona, district boundaries, and the district political ratings according to the CPVI. The delegation has a total of 9 members, with 6 Republicans and 3 Democrats.

History 
From 1863 to 1912, Arizona Territory sent one non-voting delegate to the House of Representatives. After its statehood in 1912, Arizona was granted one representative in the House. As the state's population has grown, Arizona's delegation has increased in size to its current total of nine representatives.

Historical and present district boundaries 
Table of United States congressional district boundary maps in the State of Arizona, presented chronologically. All redistricting events that took place in Arizona between 1973 and 2013 are shown.

Obsolete districts 
 Arizona Territory's at-large congressional district
 Arizona's at-large congressional district

Notes 
Due to redistricting, the congressional district numbers in Arizona have changed for the 2022 election cycle. Through this process, the district numbers have changed the following ways:

       Arizona's 1st congressional district became Arizona's 2nd congressional district

       Arizona's 2nd congressional district became Arizona's 6th congressional district

       Arizona's 3rd congressional district became Arizona's 7th congressional district

       Arizona's 4th congressional district became Arizona's 9th congressional district

       Arizona's 5th congressional district remained Arizona's 5th congressional district

       Arizona's 6th congressional district became Arizona's 1st congressional district

       Arizona's 7th congressional district became Arizona's 3rd congressional district

       Arizona's 8th congressional district remained Arizona's 8th congressional district

       Arizona's 9th congressional district became Arizona's 4th congressional district

See also 
 United States congressional delegations from Arizona
 List of United States congressional districts

References

External links